Trioza barrettae is a sap-sucking bug species in the genus Trioza. The species is endemic to Western Australia.

References

Triozidae
Hemiptera of Australia
Insects described in 2014